Bela Crkva is a town in Vojvodina, Serbia.

Bela Crkva (Cyrillic: Бела Црква, "White Church") may also refer to:

 Bela Crkva, Krivogaštani, a village in the Municipality of Krivogaštani, North Macedonia
 Bela Crkva (Krupanj), a village in the Mačva District of Serbia
 Toplička Bela Crkva, original name of the city of Kuršumlija, Serbia
 White Church of Karan (Bela crkva karanska) in the village of Karan, Serbia

See also
 Bila Tserkva (Біла Церква), a city in the Kiev Oblast of Ukraine
 Byala Cherkva, a town in the Veliko Turnovo oblast of Bulgaria